Jury Veselov (alternate listing as Jurij Veselov, born February 20, 1982) is a Russian luger who has competed since 1999. Competing in two Winter Olympics, he earned his best finish of 11th in the men's doubles event at Turin in 2006.

Veselov's best finish at the FIL World Luge Championships was 11th twice in the men's doubles event (2004, 2007). Veselov represented Russia in the 2007 Olympics and won 1 gold medal.

References
 2002 luge men's doubles results
 2006 luge men's doubles results
 CBS Sportsline.com profile
 FIL-Luge profile: Veselov, Jurij

External links
 
 
 

1982 births
Living people
Russian male lugers
Olympic lugers of Russia
Lugers at the 2002 Winter Olympics
Lugers at the 2006 Winter Olympics